Henry Gilbert (1868–1936) was a popular children's author, and the paternal grandfather of Molly Holden.  His books continue to be reprinted. His books are noted for both their historical accuracy and their style.

Bibliography
 Robin Hood and the Men of the Greenwood (1912) The first significant new version on the classic Robin Hood theme, also republished as Robin Hood.
 King Arthur's knights: the tales retold for boys and girls (Stokes, 1911) 
 The Book of Pirates (T, Y. Crowell & Co.) 
 Pirates: True Tales of Notorious Buccaneers
 The conquerors of Peru: Retold from Prescott's "Conquest of Peru" 
 The conquerors of Mexico: Retold from Prescott's "Conquest of Mexico"

References

External links
 
 
 
 
Full text for The Conquerors of Peru, George G. Harrap & Company, 1913.

1868 births
1937 deaths
English children's writers
English male writers